"My Funny Friend and Me" is a song by English musician Sting. It was written by Sting and David Hartley for Walt Disney Pictures' 40th animated feature film The Emperor's New Groove. When the film began development in 1994 under the title Kingdom of the Sun, Sting was hired to write the film's songs. Released in November 2000, the track reached 24 on the American Billboard Adult Contemporary Singles chart, and was nominated for the Academy Award for Best Original Song at the 73rd Academy Awards in 2001.

Charts

Personnel
Produced and arranged by Jimmy Jam and Terry Lewis
Co-produced by "Big Jim" Wright
Vocals recorded by Dave Rideau (assisted by Pablo Munguia) at Westlake Audio
Track and background vocals recorded and mixed by Steve Hodge (assisted by Brad Yost and Xavier Smith) at Flyte Tyme Studios, Edina, MN
Background vocals: Terry Lewis, Big Jim, Tony Tolbert and James Grear
Guitar: Dave Barry
Drum programming: Alex Richbourg
Additional instruments: Jimmy Jam and Terry Lewis

References

The Emperor's New Groove
Songs about friendship
2000s ballads
2000 singles
2000 songs
Sting (musician) songs
Disney songs
Songs written for animated films
Pop ballads
Songs written by Sting (musician)
Song recordings produced by Jimmy Jam and Terry Lewis
Walt Disney Records singles